Acharya Janki Ballabh Shastri (5 February 1916 – 7 April 2011) was an Indian Hindi poet, writer and critic. He declined to accept Padma Shri in 2010 stating his disciples deserved much more than Shri. He also refused the Padmashri in 1994.

Early life

Janki Ballabh Shastri was born at Maigra village in Gaya district in a Sakaldwipiya Brahmins family.

Career
Janki Ballabh Shastri has written many well-known stories, novels, plays, biographies, essays, ghazals and songs.

Among his famous works are "Bandi Mandiram", "Kakali" "Radha" (an epic running in seven volumes), Roop Aaroop, Teer Tarang, Meghgeet, "Gaatha",Pashani, Tamsa, Iravati, "Kalidas" (Novel), "Ek kiran so Jhaian" (Short Stories), "Trai" and "Unkaha Niral".

Awards
Shastri has been respected with various awards such as the Rajendra Shikhar Award, Bharat Bharti Award, Shiv Poojan Sahay Award, etc.

References
`
 Bihar state text book (1986) publication Hindi class 9th and 10th (Dinesh kumar)

1916 births
2011 deaths
Indian male poets
Indian literary critics
20th-century Indian poets
People from Gaya, India
Poets from Bihar
20th-century Indian male writers